Air hammer may refer to:

Air hammer (fabrication), a smaller hand-held or free-standing hammer used in fabrication work
Air hammer (forging), a larger air driven power forging hammer
Air hammer (pile driver), a pile driver that is driven by air
Air Hammer (Transformers), a Beast Wars character
Jackhammer, a larger pneumatic hand tool used to break up matter
Nail gun, a pneumatic tool that drives nails
Rivet gun or pneumatic hammer is used to drive/peen steel rivets in ship building and joining structural steel elements

See also
Pneumatic hammer (disambiguation)